The 2003 Congo air disaster occurred on 8 May 2003 when a cargo door of an Ilyushin Il-76 owned by Ukrainian Cargo Airways accidentally opened mid-flight while the aircraft was flying over Mbuji-Mayi with more than 160 people on board. The flight was conducting a civilian transport from Kinshasa in the southwest of the country to Lubumbashi in the southeast. Seventeen people were confirmed dead by the Congolese government, while officials estimated that 60 lost their lives. Survivors even claimed a higher number of fatalities, claiming that as many as 200 people were sucked out to their deaths.

Incident
The incident occurred above the city of Mbuji-Mayi on the night of 8 May 2003. The aircraft was an Ilyushin Il-76 registered as UR-UCB and was operated by Ukrainian Cargo Airways, a Ukrainian state-owned charter airline company based in Kyiv. The two-hour flight was chartered by the military to transport soldiers and their families to Lubumbashi, home to a large Congolese military base and located in the south of the country in Haut-Katanga Province. The cargo compartment was full of passengers; many were sleeping in the middle section and near the cargo door. The aircraft had no proper seating, and there were only folding chairs in the cabin, with people "crammed onto benches and on the floor."

Several people were clinging to ropes, bags and netting on the interior wall of the plane. Survivors described the scene as chaotic, with passengers screaming and flying out of the open door. Several people who had been sleeping were awakened by other passengers' screams. They also claimed that the plane suddenly tilted to the left and right, causing more people to be sucked out. Several people who had clung onto ropes lost their grips and were sucked out to their deaths. A secured truck on the cargo hold may have saved many lives as it may have acted like a barrier.

One survivors described the commotion: "I was just next to the door and I had the chance to grab onto a ladder just before the door let loose." Another said, "I saw a soldier cradling a baby and a mother with a baby near the door suddenly just being wrenched into the darkness." 

The aircraft managed to return to Kinshasha after the incident. The Congolese government ordered an immediate search for the passengers who had been sucked out of the aircraft. Survivors claimed that many people had disappeared after the incident, and stated that as many as 200 people, including women and children, were killed in the incident. Ukrainian defence ministry spokesman Konstantin Khyvrenko stated that no one was hurt in the accident, but survivors stated that many were injured by flying baggage and cargo. At least two pregnant women experienced miscarriages resulting from shock. The government only confirmed the deaths of 17 people, while officials estimated that as many as 60 may have been killed and airport officials placed the number of fatalities at 129. Aviation officials and western diplomats in Congo estimated that at least 170 people were killed in the incident. Of the more than 160 passengers in the cargo compartment, only about 40% returned to the airport.

Investigation
An investigation was ordered immediately after the disaster. Information minister Kikaya Bin Karubi told Reuters that the Congolese Air Force and Army were investigating to determine whether the accident was the result of human error or a mechanical problem. Sergeant Kabmba Kashala said that the aircraft had taken off with the door improperly fastened and that the door had flung open after three failed attempts to fully shut it mid-flight. The pilot suggested that the door had opened either after one of the passengers tinkered with its controls, or because of a computer glitch. He stated that a passenger could have been "touching the button for special opening device."

References

External links
 Accident Description, Aviation Safety Network

2003 disasters in the Democratic Republic of the Congo
Aviation accidents and incidents in 2003
Aviation accidents and incidents in the Democratic Republic of the Congo
2003 in the Democratic Republic of the Congo
May 2003 events in Africa
Accidents and incidents involving the Ilyushin Il-76
Airliner accidents and incidents involving in-flight depressurization
Airliner accidents and incidents caused by in-flight structural failure